Ondina is a genus of sea snails, marine gastropod mollusks in the family Pyramidellidae, the pyrams and their allies.

Description
The thin shell has an oval shape. The whorls of the teleoconch are smooth or spirally striated. The  columellar tooth is obsolete.

Species
Species within the genus Ondina include:
 Ondina anceps (Gaglini, 1992)
 Ondina coarctata (Sars G.O., 1878)
 Ondina crystallina Locard, 1892
 Ondina diaphana (Jeffreys, 1848)
 Ondina dilucida (Monterosato, 1884)
 Ondina divisa (Adams J., 1797)
 Ondina elachisinoides Hori & Fukuda, 1999
 Ondina fragilissima Peñas & Rolán, 2002
 Ondina jansseni van Aartsen & Menkhorst, 1996
 Ondina modiola (Monterosato, 1884)
 Ondina mosti (van Aartsen, Gittenberger & Goud, 1998)
 Ondina neocrystallina Gaglini, 1991
 Ondina normani (Friele, 1886)
 Ondina obliqua (Alder, 1844)
 Ondina perezi (Dautzenberg & Fisher, 1925)
 Ondina scandens (Monterosato, 1884)
 Ondina strufaldii Peñas & Rolán, 1999
 Ondina vitrea (Brusina, 1866)
 Ondina warreni (Thompson W., 1845)

References

 Aartsen, J.J. van, 1987. European Pyramidellidae:III. Odostomia and Ondina. — Boll, malac. 23:1-34

External links
 To GenBank
 To World Register of Marine Species

Pyramidellidae
Monotypic gastropod genera